Rio Grande Valley may refer to:
 Lower Rio Grande Valley, a region of South Texas and northeastern Mexico
 Rio Grande Valley (New Mexico), the river valley from Cochiti Pueblo, New Mexico to El Paso, Texas

Rio Grande Valley may also refer to:
The drainage basin of the Rio Grande
Rio Grande Valley State Park
Rio Grande rift
Rio Grande Gorge
Middle Rio Grande Valley AVA
Mesilla Valley